At His Best may refer to:

Albums
Bob Marley at His Best
Eric Clapton at His Best
Ginger Baker at His Best 
Lou Donaldson at His Best 1966 
Mario! Lanza at His Best 1995
Rodriguez at His Best